City Square Mall (Chinese: 城市广场; Pinyin: Chéng Shì Guǎng Chǎng) is Singapore's first eco-mall to be integrated with a  urban park named City Green, located within the planning area of Kallang. The mall sits on the site of Singapore's historic New World Amusement Park and is directly connected to Farrer Park MRT station. City Green is designed to provide a learning experience about ecology and the natural environment.

City Square Mall is the first mall in Singapore awarded the Green Mark Platinum Award by the Building and Construction Authority (BCA).

References

External links
 

City Developments Limited
Shopping malls in Singapore
Shopping malls established in 2009
2009 establishments in Singapore
Kallang